Lewisville is a city in Jefferson County, Idaho, United States. The population was 458 at the 2010 census.

Lewisville is part of the Idaho Falls Metropolitan Statistical Area.

History
Lewisville was established in 1882.

In 1960, Lewisville became the corporate headquarters of Idahoan Foods, a producer of dehydrated potato products such as instant mashed potatoes, potato casserole, and hash browns.

For the city's important role in Idaho's potato industry, Governor Butch Otter proclaimed August 11, 2007 "Lewisville Day" statewide.

Geography
Lewisville is located at  (43.694860, -112.012110).

Demographics

As of 2000 the median income for a household in the city was $55,481, and the median income for a family was $56,442 . Males had a median income of $30,476 versus $12,115 for females. The per capita income for the city was $16,306.  About 1.60% of families and 7.11% of the population were below the poverty line.

2010 census
As of the census of 2010, there were 458 people, 159 households, and 129 families residing in the city. The racial makeup of the city was 89.74% White, 11.35% Hispanic, 0.87% Native American,0.44% from Asian,  7.21% from other races, and 1.75% from two or more races.

There were 129 households, of which 34.6% had children under the age of 18 living with them, 66.7% were married couples living together, 9.4% had a female householder with no husband present, 5% had a male householder with no wife present. 16.4% had someone living alone who was 65 years of age or older.  The average household size was 2.88 and the average family size was 3.19.

In the city, the population was spread out, with 28.6% under the age of 18, 7.3% from 18 to 24, 23.1% from 25 to 44, 25.8% from 45 to 64, and 15.2% who were 65 years of age or older.  The median age was 34 years. For every 100 females, there were 105.7 males.  For every 100 females age 18 and over, there were 102.5 males.

Education
It is within Jefferson County School District 251. It is zoned to Midway Elementary School in Menan.

References

Cities in Idaho
Cities in Jefferson County, Idaho
Cities in Idaho Falls metropolitan area
Populated places established in 1882